The Ivy is a British restaurant which is known for being popular with celebrities. It is located on West Street near Cambridge Circus in London, opposite the Ambassadors and St Martin's theatres, making it a popular restaurant for theatergoers.
The Ivy has locations around the world.

History

1917–1989
The original restaurant was opened by Abel Giandolini in 1917 as an unlicensed Italian café in a building on the same site.  Legend has it that the name itself originated from a chance remark by the actress Alice Delysia, who overheard Giandolini apologise to a customer for the inconvenience caused by building works. When he said that it was because of his intention to create a restaurant of the highest class, she interjected "Don't worry – we will always come and see you. 'We will cling together like the ivy'", a line from the then-popular song, 1902's "Just Like the Ivy I'll Cling to You", written by A. J. Mills and Harry Castling.
The restaurant expanded into the current premises in 1929 run by Giandolini, with his longstanding maitre d' Mario Gallati as host.

In part due to its proximity to the West End theatres, exclusivity and late closing time (it is still open until close to midnight), the restaurant quickly became a theatrical institution, with Laurence Olivier and Vivien Leigh, Marlene Dietrich, John Gielgud, Lilian Braithwaite, Terence Rattigan, Binkie Beaumont and Noël Coward being habitués, having their regular two-seater tables along the walls. According to the actor Donald Sinden in his Sky Arts television documentary series Great West End Theatres, The Ivy became so famous as a theatrical-celebrities haunt that in the 1943 revue Sweet and Low which ran for almost six years at the neighbouring Ambassadors Theatre, there was a satirical sketch included, updated regularly, entitled Poison Ivy, where the show's star Hermione Gingold "would exchange wicked and salacious celebrity gossip".

In 1950, Giandolini sold The Ivy to Bernard Walsh and the restaurant became part of his Wheeler's group of fish restaurants. Subsequent owners were Lady Grade and the Forte Foundation. After closing in 1989, Jeremy King and Chris Corbin, who owned Le Caprice, bought it.

1990–present
Under its new owners, the restaurant was totally renovated to a design by American architect MJ Long incorporating specially-commissioned artworks by Sir Eduardo Paolozzi, Sir Peter Blake, Sir Howard Hodgkin, Bridget Riley, Allen Jones, Joe Tilson, Patrick Caulfield, Michael Craig-Martin and Tom Phillips. The restaurant opened in June 1990. The restaurant seats 100 guests with a private dining room on the first floor, seating up to 60 guests. Mobile phones and cameras are forbidden anywhere in the restaurant or adjoining club and there is a dress code, where smart casual attire is required.

A recipe book, The Ivy: The Restaurant and its Recipes, written by the restaurant critic A. A. Gill was published in 1997.

Fernando Peire was appointed senior maître d', eventually leaving in December 1998, three months after the restaurant was sold to Belgo PLC as part of Caprice Holdings Ltd; Corbin and King departed two years later (whereupon they established their own Rex Restaurants, later Corbin & King).

In 2000, the restaurant was awarded the Moët & Chandon London Restaurant Award for excellence.

In 2005 the entrepreneur Richard Caring bought The Ivy and the Caprice Holdings group (which owns Le Caprice in the St James's area of London, J. Sheekey near Leicester Square, Scotts in Mount Street and 34 in Grosvenor Square). In 2007 Fernando Peire returned to The Ivy as Director of The Ivy and The Club at The Ivy. Gary Lee, who had previously been in charge of private functions at The Ivy, returned as head chef and was appointed executive chef in 2008. Executive chef director of Caprice Holdings restaurants (now Caprice Group) is Tim Hughes.

The Club at The Ivy
In September 2008, The Club at The Ivy, a private members' club with a hidden entrance via an adjacent flower-shop, was opened on the three floors above the restaurant, with membership (drawn primarily from creative industries and the arts) "as hard to get as a table at The Ivy itself" according to the author A. A. Gill.

It has a Piano Lounge; a dining room ("The Drawing Room"), open for breakfast, lunch and supper; a wood-panelled library "of books that reflect many of our members' interests in art, literature, film, theatre, architecture and design"; a film screening-room and entertainment space known as the Loft; a further private dining-room seating up to 14 people and a cigar-terrace.

Its former director was Fernando Peire who left in June 2021, the former senior maître d' (star of the Channel 5 TV series ''The Restaurant Inspector).

The Ivy Asia 
The Ivy Asia is a restaurant coming under the Ivy Restaurant group, offering luxurious Asian-inspired food and drink.

The original Ivy Asia restaurant launched in May 2021 in the Ivy Manchester Spinningfields branch, and due to its success, there are now multiple branches across the UK, including in Cardiff, Brighton, London (Chelsea, Mayfair and St Paul's) and Leeds.

The Ivy Collection
In 2011 the company planned to open the first Ivy Café, in London's Mayfair; however, this did not take place.

Since 2014 the company has opened over 30 spin-off restaurants, the Ivy Collection, known as Ivy Cafés and Ivy Brasseries.

See also
 List of restaurants in London

References

External links
 – official site
 – official site

Restaurants in London
1916 establishments in England
Restaurants established in 1929
Buildings and structures in the City of Westminster